Year 955 (CMLV) was a common year starting on Monday (link will display the full calendar) of the Julian calendar.

Events 
 By place 

 Europe 
 August 10 – Battle of Lechfeld: King Otto I ("the Great") defeats the Hungarians (also known as Magyars) near Augsburg (Germany). Otto's army (7,000 men), mainly composed of heavy cavalry, overwhelms the Hungarians along the Lech River. The German losses are heavy, among them Conrad ("the Red") and many other nobles. The commanders of the Hungarian army, Bulcsú and Lehel, are captured and executed. This victory puts an end to the Hungarian campaigns into western Europe.
 October 16 – Battle on the Raxa: Otto I, allied with the Rani tribe, defeats the Obotrite federation, led by Nako and his brother Stoigniew (probably at the Recknitz or Elde rivers) near Mecklenburg. The Elbe Slavs are forced to pay tribute, and accept a peace agreement.

 England 
 November 23 – King Eadred (or Edred) dies childless after a 9-year reign at Frome (Somerset). He is succeeded by his 15-year-old nephew, Eadwig, as King of England.

 Africa 
 The Kharijite Banu Ya'la tribe revolts against the Fatimid Caliphate in Ifriqiya and destroys the city of Oran (modern Algeria). They construct a new capital, Ifgan, near Mascara.

 By topic 

 Religion 
 November 8 – Pope Agapetus II dies after a 9-year reign. He is succeeded by John XII, the son of Alberic II (the late ruler of Rome), as the 130th pope of the Catholic Church.

Births 
 May 10 – Al-Aziz Billah, caliph of the Fatimid Caliphate (d. 996)
 October 22 – Qian Weijun, king of Wuyue (Ten Kingdoms) (d. 991)
 November 9 – Gyeongjong of Goryeo, ruler of Korea (d. 981)
 Aboazar Lovesendes, Portuguese nobleman (approximate date)
 Ælfric of Eynsham, English abbot and writer (approximate date)
 Arduin of Ivrea (I), Lombard margrave and king of Italy (approximate date)
 Eido I (or Ägidius), German nobleman and bishop (d. 1015)
 Ezzo (or Ehrenfried), Count Palatine of Lotharingia (Germany) (approximate date)
 Gisela of Burgundy, duchess of Bavaria (approximate date)
 Gunther of Bohemia, German hermit and saint (d. 1045)
 Lutgardis of Luxemburg, countess of Holland (Netherlands)
 Matilda, Abbess of Quedlinburg, German princess-abbess and daughter of Otto I (d. 999)
 Otto II, Holy Roman Emperor ("the Red") (d. 983)
 Theophanu, empress consort of the Holy Roman Empire (d. 991)
 Kunhsaw Kyaunghpyu, king of the Pagan dynasty (d. 1048)

Deaths 
 July 23 – He Ning, Chinese official and chancellor (b. 898)
 August 10 
 Bulcsú, Hungarian tribal chieftain (horka)
 Conrad ("the Red"), duke of Lorraine 
 October 16 – Stoigniew, Obotrite prince and co-ruler
 November 1 – Henry I, Duke of Bavaria
 November 8 – Pope Agapetus II, Catholic Church pontiff (b. 905)
 November 23 – Eadred (or Edred), king of England (b. 923)
 Abu 'Ali Chaghani, ruler of Chaghaniyan (Turkmenistan)
 Bermudo Núñez, count of Cea (Spain) (approximate date)
 Gamle Eirikssen, Norwegian Viking ruler (b. 910)
 Hervé I, count of Mortagne and Perche
 Lehel, Hungarian tribal chieftain (horka)
 Muhammad ibn Shaddad, Shaddadid ruler
 Parantaka I, ruler of Chola Kingdom (India)
 Sultan Satuq Bughra Khan, Kara-Khanid ruler

References